Kuk Son-young (born September 20, 1992), known professionally as Shine Kuk, is a South Korean actress, television presenter and singer active in the Philippines. She came into prominence after winning Eat Bulaga's "You're My Foreignay" contest in 2014. Kuk has since gone on to star in various television shows and win Miss Korea Philippines 2018. She was also the first Korean host on the Shop TV home shopping channel.

Biography
Kuk first visited the Philippines on a family trip.

She is known as Eat Bulaga " You're My Foreignay" Grand Winner of 2014 and also one of its co-hosts.

An aspiring student, actress and singer, Shine studied Consular and Diplomatic Affairs at De La Salle–College of Saint Benilde and graduated. She also recently appeared as a guest actress in the sitcom "Vampire Ang Daddy Ko" and also became a co-host of Eat Bulaga's "Juan for All, All for Juan" and "Dabarkads Pinoy Henyo!". She is a regular cast in the comedy gag show Banana Sundae.

Kuk won Miss Korea Philippines 2018 when she was 25 years old. At the time, she was a television personality on ABS-CBN.

Kuk started a YouTube channel with a focus on Filipino lessons and Korean make up in 2019. She was the first Korean host on the Shop TV home shopping channel.

Filmography

Television

Films

References

1993 births
Living people
South Korean television actresses
South Korean expatriates in the Philippines
South Korean television personalities
21st-century South Korean singers
De La Salle–College of Saint Benilde alumni
21st-century South Korean women singers